UFC 150: Henderson vs. Edgar II was a mixed martial arts event held by the Ultimate Fighting Championship on August 11, 2012, at the Pepsi Center now known as Ball Arena in Denver, Colorado.

Background

A fight between Dennis Hallman and Thiago Tavares was expected for this card. However, on July 12 it was announced that the fight was moved to the UFC 151 card.

Luiz Cane was expected to face Yushin Okami at this event.  However, Cane was forced out of the bout with an injury and replaced by Rousimar Palhares. Palhares himself was forced out of the bout with Okami with an injury and was replaced by Buddy Roberts. Roberts was already on the card, originally scheduled against Chris Camozzi, but Camozzi was also forced off the card with an injury.

At the weigh-ins, Melvin Guillard was the only one of 20 fighters who missed weight. Guillard, who fought former training partner Donald Cerrone, weighed 157.5 pounds on his first try. He was given two hours to cut to the lightweight maximum of 156 pounds, but he elected instead to surrender an undisclosed percentage of his fight purse to Cerrone, who weighed 155 pounds.

Results

Bonus awards
Fighters were awarded $60,000 bonuses.
Fight of the Night: Donald Cerrone vs. Melvin Guillard
Knockout of the Night: Donald Cerrone
Submission of the Night: Dennis Bermudez

See also
List of UFC events
2012 in UFC

References

External links
 Official UFC past events page
 UFC event results at Sherdog.com

Ultimate Fighting Championship events
2012 in mixed martial arts
Mixed martial arts in Colorado
Sports competitions in Denver
2012 in sports in Colorado
August 2012 sports events in the United States
Events in Denver